Rasmus Jarlov (born 29 April 1977 in Aarhus) is a Danish politician, who is a member of the Folketing for the Conservative People's Party. He was elected into parliament at the 2015 Danish general election, and formerly sat from 2010 to 2011. He is a former Minister of Business Affairs.

Political career
Jarlov was a temporary member of parliament from 12 January 2010 to 31 August 2010, acting as substitute for Charlotte Dyremose. On 1 September 2010 Henrik Rasmussen resigned his seat and Jarlov took over the seat. He sat in parliament for the remainder of the term. He was elected into parliament again at the 2015 election. From 2018 to 2019 he was Minister of Business Affairs.

External links 
 Biography on the website of the Danish Parliament (Folketinget)

References 

Living people
1977 births
People from Aarhus
Conservative People's Party (Denmark) politicians
Government ministers of Denmark
Members of the Folketing 2007–2011
Members of the Folketing 2015–2019
Members of the Folketing 2019–2022
Members of the Folketing 2022–2026